Monika Helfer (born 18 October 1947, in Au) is an Austrian writer. She was invested with the Austrian Decoration for Science and Art in 2016. She was the recipient of the Solothurner Literaturpreis in 2020, and the Schubart-Literaturpreis in 2021. She has been nominated twice for the German Book Prize in 2017 and 2021.

References 

1947 births
Living people
Austrian writers